Flavokavains (also called flavokawains) are a class of chalconoids found in the kava plant. Currently identified types include flavokavain A, flavokavain B, and flavokavain C.

References

See also
Kavalactone
Kava

Kava